Crossotus brunneopictus is a species of beetle in the family Cerambycidae. It was described by Fairmaire in 1891.

References

brunneopictus
Beetles described in 1891